Federico Matias Vieyra (born 21 July 1988) is an Argentine handball player for Handball Sassari and the Argentina men's national handball team.

He defended Argentina at the 2012 London Summer Olympics, the 2016 Rio de Janeiro Summer Olympics in Rio, and the 2015 World Men's Handball Championship in Qatar.

References

External links

1988 births
Living people
Argentine male handball players
Olympic handball players of Argentina
Handball players at the 2012 Summer Olympics
Handball players at the 2016 Summer Olympics
Handball players at the 2011 Pan American Games
Handball players at the 2015 Pan American Games
Pan American Games medalists in handball
Pan American Games gold medalists for Argentina
Pan American Games silver medalists for Argentina
Expatriate handball players
Argentine expatriate sportspeople in Spain
Liga ASOBAL players
CB Ademar León players
Sportspeople from Buenos Aires
South American Games silver medalists for Argentina
South American Games medalists in handball
Competitors at the 2018 South American Games
Medalists at the 2015 Pan American Games
Medalists at the 2011 Pan American Games
21st-century Argentine people